Platon may refer to:

People 
 Plato (Πλάτων, romanized as Plátōn), Greek philosopher
 Plato (comic poet) (fl. 420–391 BCE)
 Plato of Bactria (2nd century BCE), Greco-Bactrian king
 Plato (exarch) (fl. 645–653), Byzantine exarch of Ravenna
 Platon, obscure ancient Greek writer of uncertain date, whose attributed works share a name with those of Aristagoras (poet)
 Plato of Sakkoudion (735–814), Byzantine saint
 Platon Levshin (1737–1812), Metropolitan of Moscow
 Nikolaos Platon (1909–1992), Greek archaeologist
 Platon (Kulbusch) (1869–1919), Estonian Orthodox Church bishop of Tallinn and all Estonia
 Platon Chirnoagă (1894–1974), Romanian Brigadier-General during World War II
 Platon (photographer) (born 1968), Greek-English photographer

Places 
 Platoń, a village in Poland

See also
 Plato (disambiguation)